Rajesh Vasantlal Thakker  (born 1954) is May Professor of Medicine in the Nuffield Department of Clinical Medicine at the University of Oxford and a fellow of Somerville College, Oxford. Thakker is also a Consultant physician at the Churchill Hospital and the John Radcliffe Hospital, Principal investigator (PI) at the Oxford Centre for Diabetes, Endocrinology and Metabolism (OCDEM) and was Chairman of the NIHR/MRC Efficacy and Mechanism Evaluation (EME) Board until Spring 2016.

Education
Thakker was educated at Pembroke College, Cambridge, where he was awarded his Master of Arts (MA), Bachelor of Medicine, Bachelor of Surgery (MB BChir), Doctor of Medicine (MD) and Doctor of Science (ScD) degrees. He completed his clinical training at Middlesex Hospital Medical School.

Research and career
Thakker's research investigates neuroendocrine tumours such as multiple endocrine neoplasia type 1 (MEN1) and the molecular basis of disorders of calcium homeostasis. He has supervised nine successful Doctor of Philosophy students and his research has been funded by the Medical Research Council (MRC).

Thakker has edited several books including Genetic and Molecular Biological Aspects of Endocrine Disease, Molecular Genetics of Endocrine Disorders, and Genetics of Bone Biology and Skeletal Disease.

Awards and honours
Thakker was elected a Fellow of the Royal Society (FRS) in 2014. His nomination reads:

Personal life
Thakker is married to Julie Clare Magee and has one daughter, Clare Thakker, who has qualified as a doctor from Clare College, Cambridge. He is a school governor at Oxford High School, Oxford.

References

Living people
Fellows of the Royal Society
Fellows of the Academy of Medical Sciences (United Kingdom)
1954 births
Fellows of Somerville College, Oxford
Physicians of the John Radcliffe Hospital